Carriage Club is a neighborhood in the City of Lone Tree, Douglas County, Colorado, United States. A former census-designated place (CDP), the population was 1,002 at the United States Census 2000.

Geography

See also

Outline of Colorado
Index of Colorado-related articles
State of Colorado
Colorado cities and towns
Colorado census designated places
Colorado counties
Douglas County, Colorado
List of statistical areas in Colorado
Front Range Urban Corridor
North Central Colorado Urban Area
Denver-Aurora-Boulder, CO Combined Statistical Area
Denver-Aurora-Broomfield, CO Metropolitan Statistical Area

References

External links
Douglas County website

Geography of Douglas County, Colorado
Former census-designated places in Colorado
Denver metropolitan area